The Mosque of Ala Vardi Khan is a mosque and a government of India protected monument.

Background 
It was built by Nawab Alivardi Khan in 18th century. The mosque was built along with a Sarai (Rest House). Such combination of mosques and Sarais were built at every 11th mile on journey from Delhi to Ajmer. The 200 old years mosque is located 2 km away from the old tehsil office of Gurgaon.

References 

Mosques in Haryana
Monuments and memorials in Haryana